Ilana Rozentalienė (née Epšteinaitė; born 1937) was a Lithuanian chess player. She was two times winner of Lithuanian Women's Chess Championship (1962, 1965).

Biography 
Ilana's parents died in the Kovno Ghetto, in Vilijampolė, a suburb of the city of Kaunas. Julija Bernotaitė, a Lithuanian woman, put Ilana to sleep with drugs, smuggled her in a sack of potatoes from the ghetto to a village in Radviliškis District, and introduced her to everyone as her daughter. Later, Ilana lived in Vilnius.
In the 1960s, she was one of the leading Lithuanian chess players. She won four medals at the Lithuanian Women's Chess Championships: two gold (1962, 1965) and two bronze (1960, 1968).
Her son is Eduardas Rozentalis (b. 1963), chess grandmaster. Her cousin is writer Dalija Epšteinaitė.

Literature
 Игорь Бердичевский. Шахматная еврейская энциклопедия. Москва: Русский шахматный дом, 2016 (Gad Berdichevsky. The Chess Jewish Encyclopedia. Moscow: Russian Chess House, 2016, p. 210)

References

External links 

OlimpBase :: All-Time Player History :: Epsteinaitė, I.

1937 births
Living people
People from Vilnius
Lithuanian Jews
Lithuanian female chess players
Soviet female chess players
Jewish chess players
Kovno Ghetto inmates
Holocaust survivors